Orival is a commune in the Seine-Maritime departement in the Normandy region in northern France.

Geography

History
The history of the town goes back to Neolithic times, as proved by the finds of Stone-Age tools and mammoth bones in the numerous large caves and the cliffs of the area. 
The Romans also left traces of their passing, with the remains of a fanum visible on one of the hills. 
King Richard I of England (the Lion Heart) was very active in the region, erecting a castle here in 1195. His brother John of England (known as John Lackland), could not hold on to the territory and the building was already a ruin by 1203.

Heraldry

Population

Places of interest
 The church of St. Georges, dating from the fifteenth century.
 The ruins of the thirteenth century castle of Roche-Fouet.

See also
Communes of the Seine-Maritime department

References

External links

Official Website of Orival 

Communes of Seine-Maritime